The 2016 Suwon JS Cup was an international football friendly tournament. The tournament was used to prepare the host organisers for the 2017 FIFA U-20 World Cup in South Korea.

Squads

Brazil
Head coach: Rogério Micale

France
Head coach: Ludovic Batelli

Japan
Head coach: Atsushi Uchiyama

South Korea
Head coach: Iksoo An

References 

2016 in association football
2016 in South Korean football
International association football competitions hosted by South Korea